Sir Martin Francis Wood, CBE, FRS, HonFREng (19 April 1927 – 23 November 2021) was a British engineer and entrepreneur. He co-founded Oxford Instruments, one of the first spin-out companies from the University of Oxford and still one of the most successful. He created this business out of his research into magnets, and went on to build the first commercial MRI scanner, an invention that has saved millions of lives throughout the world.

Life
Martin Wood was educated at Gresham's School, Holt and Trinity College, Cambridge University, where he read engineering, and Imperial College, London. In 1945 he joined the Coal Board as a Bevin Boy for his National Service, working underground at the coal face first in South Wales and later in the Midlands. From 1955 to 1969, he was a Senior Research Officer at the Clarendon Laboratory at the University of Oxford. He used the knowledge he acquired on high field magnets to form Oxford Instruments in 1959, at his home in Northmoor Road, North Oxford. Two years later new superconductors were developed in the USA, and he soon acquired some material and made the first superconducting magnet outside the USA in 1962. Oxford Instruments has since developed these magnets for research and NMR analysis and eventually developed the whole-body superconducting magnets which made possible the development of magnetic resonance imaging.

Sir Martin Wood and his wife, Audrey, have many philanthropic achievements, including donating £2m for the building of the Sir Martin Wood Lecture Theatre at the Clarendon Laboratory. He also founded the Earth Trust to promote nature conservation at Little Wittenham and the Wittenham Clumps, The Oxford Trust for the promotion of scientific education and science-based enterprise, and the Sylva Foundation to support sustainable forest management. In 2005, Oxford Innovation, a company that came out of the Oxford Trust, launched the Martin and Audrey Wood Enterprise Awards for entrepreneurship.

Wood was knighted by the Queen at Buckingham Palace in 1986. He was elected a Fellow of the Royal Society in 1987, was a recipient of the Order of the Rising Sun, and received honorary degrees from eight British universities.  He was President of Farm Africa, a development charity co-founded by his late brother Sir Michael Wood.

He died after a short illness on 23 November 2021, at the age of 94. His work pioneering the development of superconducting magnets facilitated Magnetic Resonance Imaging (MRI), leading to millions of lives being saved every year.

Honours
Wood received a number of honours:

 Honorary doctorate from Oxford University 
 Royal Society Mullard Award
 Fellow of the Royal Society, 1987
 Commander of the Order of the British Empire
 Order of the Rising Sun
 Knighthood
 Honorary Fellow of the Royal Academy of Engineering in 1994
 President's Medal of the IOP, 2002

References

Further reading
 Audrey Wood — Magnetic Venture: The Story of Oxford Instruments (Oxford University Press, 2001). .

External links
 The Oxford Trust
 Oxford Instruments plc
 Honorary degrees: University of Oxford Annual Review 2003–4
 Martin and Audrey Wood Enterprise Awards
 Sylva Foundation
 Oxford Innovation

1927 births
2021 deaths
People educated at Gresham's School
Alumni of Trinity College, Cambridge
Alumni of Imperial College London
People associated with the University of Oxford
English electrical engineers
English businesspeople
English philanthropists
Fellows of the Royal Society
Fellows of the Royal Academy of Engineering
Commanders of the Order of the British Empire
Knights Bachelor